The Riverside Stadium is a football stadium in Middlesbrough, England, which has been the home of Middlesbrough since it opened in 1995. Its current capacity is 34,742, all seated, although there is provisional planning permission in place to expand that to 42,000 if required.

History
The stadium was built to replace Ayresome Park after the Taylor Report, which required all top division football stadiums to be all-seater. After the report was delivered in January 1990, Middlesbrough needed an all-seater stadium by August 1994, and were unable to expand Ayresome Park outwards owing to its location in a residential area, and expanding the stadium upwards would have limited the club to a capacity of around 20,000 seats – the club wanted a considerably larger capacity. The decision was taken by club officials to build a new stadium; Teesside Development Corporation offered them the Middlehaven site by the River Tees for development.

The new 30,000 seater stadium was constructed by Taylor Woodrow Construction for £16 million, taking approximately nine months to complete after work began in the autumn of 1994.  The name of the stadium was chosen by the club's fans, following a vote during the final game at Ayresome Park.  The other choices available were Middlehaven Stadium, Erimus Stadium and Teesside Stadium.  When first opened, the name was amended to Cellnet Riverside Stadium (and then BT Cellnet Riverside Stadium) as part of a £3 million sponsorship deal with Cellnet, but this deal ended after the 2001–02 season.

The first game was played against Chelsea in front of a 28,286 crowd (the highest home attendance in 14 years) on 26 August 1995. Middlesbrough won the game 2–0, with Craig Hignett taking the honour of scoring the first ever goal at the stadium, Jan Åge Fjørtoft scoring the second. Their first season at their new stadium was also their first back in the Premier League following promotion after two seasons away.

In their second season at the Riverside Stadium, Middlesbrough were runners-up in both of the domestic cups but a points deduction in the league meant that they were relegated from the Premier League.

In 1998 – when Middlesbrough were promoted back to the Premier League at the first attempt – the capacity was increased by 5,000 by filling in the north and south-west corners at a cost of £5 million. This expansion gave the stadium a 35,100 capacity.  Modernisation of the stadium since then has led to the seating being reorganised on several occasions with the stadium currently having a capacity of 34,000 (2017-18 season). The club have the Council's permission to extend the stadium by another 7,000 if demand made it necessary, which would bring its capacity up to approximately 42,000.

In 2005 the club resurrected the old Ayresome Park gates which had been famously locked when the club went into liquidation. They were erected outside the Riverside Stadium as a reminder of the past.  Another addition has been statues of former players, George Hardwick, Wilf Mannion & George Camsell in front of the old Ayresome park gates is the location for the "Borobrick Road", where fans could pay to have a message inscribed on a brick (often in memory of a deceased family member) to be added to the road.  For Armistice Day 2008, a set of bricks commemorating 8 players who died in the World Wars was unveiled.

In July 2008, planning permission was granted by Middlesbrough Council to construct a wind turbine at the site of the stadium, standing 125 metres high and capable of generating 3 megawatts of electricity. The turbine will be used to power the stadium, with the excess being sold to the National Grid.

On 24 April 2012, it was announced that the stadium would host the only public warm up match for the Great Britain Olympic football team before the London 2012 Olympic Games against Brazil. Football stars including Ryan Giggs, Craig Bellamy, Thiago Silva, Neymar, Lucas Moura and Hulk all featured in the match in which Brazil outclassed Great Britain, winning 2–0.

On 15 March 2013, it was announced that Conference National side Gateshead would stage a "home" game at the Riverside Stadium, after continual drainage problems at Gateshead International Stadium caused them to play their last 12 league games of the season at five different venues.

Following the club's promotion to the Premier League at the end of the 2015–16 season, the ground underwent a £5m package of renovations designed to bring it up to the standards required of Premier League stadiums. Renovations included the installation of a large press box at the back of the East Stand, the construction of two permanent TV studios at the back of the South East Corner, with associated access and TV compound on the stadium's exterior, an internal reorganisation of the West Stand reception, tunnel and changing room area, new floodlights and refurbished concourse areas including the addition of new kiosks and card and contactless payment methods.

Stadium details
The stadium is fully enclosed with every seat offering an uninterrupted view of the pitch. The four main stands are commonly known as the North, East, West and South stands. The corners are referred to as the North-East, North-West, South-East and South-West corners. Concourses run around the entirety of the ground with kiosks serving food and drink.

The North stand backs on to the River Tees and at the back of the Stand is some of the vocal support is housed, and thus is also known as the New Holgate End in reference the Holgate End at Ayresome Park, where the similar vocal supporters were located.

The West stand runs along the length of the pitch and is the stadium's largest stand. The stand contains a number of executive boxes along its length as well as restaurants etc. The stand houses the changing rooms, and the players tunnel emerges from the middle of the stand. White seating in the top tier spells out the club's nickname "BORO".

The East stand greets the players as they walk out the tunnel. The main television gantry was relocated to the top of the stand from the west stand in 2016. White seating in the top tier of the stand spells out "MFC". The roof houses five flagpoles with various flags flying, usually representing the league and cup competitions the club are participating in, as well as a flag of the team crest. A new press box was installed at the back of this stand in preparation for the club's re-entry into the Premier League. The East stand houses a Family Zone (North East end) and also visiting supporters (South East Corner). Prior the 2016–17 season, two permanent television studios were installed at the back of the South East Corner, on either side of the existing giant TV screen. One effect of this was a reduction in overall capacity.

The South stand previously housed visiting supporters (now relocated to the East stand), but since the 2013–14 season is currently (2017–18) occupied by home supporters. It includes most of the vocal support  is held, including Boro's own "Ultras" Group, the "Red Faction".

Records and statistics
Record Attendance (all teams): 35,000 England v Slovakia, 11 June 2003, (Euro 2004 qualifier)
Record Attendance (Middlesbrough): 34,836 v Norwich City, 28 December 2004 (FA Premier League)

|-
|The above does not include attendances for cup competitions or play off matches.
Notes:

Other uses

International matches

Association football
Like its predecessor Ayresome Park, the Riverside Stadium has played host to international football. During the construction of the new Wembley Stadium, the England national football team toured the country, playing at varying grounds. The Riverside was chosen to host the Euro 2004 qualifying match against Slovakia on 11 June 2003. England won the match 2–1 with a brace from Michael Owen after Vladimír Janočko had put Slovakia ahead. The match is also notable for pitting Middlesbrough's England defender Gareth Southgate against their own Slovakian striker at the time, Szilárd Németh. In April 2021, it was announced that the Riverside Stadium would host two England friendly matches, against Austria and Romania, in preparation for the Euro 2020 Championship.

In February 2022, the Riverside Stadium hosted 2 games of the Arnold Clark Cup, an invitational women's association football tournament featuring England, Canada, Germany and Spain.

Rugby League
The Riverside Stadium was one of the venues for the 2021 Men's Rugby League World Cup, hosting the penultimate group D match between Tonga and the Cook Islands. Tonga won by 92 points to 10 and thus qualified for the quarter-finals as group winners whilst the Cook Islands were eliminated from the competition.

Concerts

On 1 June 2019, Take That performed at the Riverside Stadium in front of 32,000 fans, as part of their 2019 30th Anniversary tour. They were supported by Rick Astley, the first time a concert had been held at the stadium.

On 1 June 2022, The Killers, supported by the Manic Street Preachers, played at the stadium in front of 33,000 fans as part of the UK leg of their Imploding the Mirage tour.

In late September 2022, it was announced that the Arctic Monkeys, supported by The Hives and The Mysterines, are scheduled to play at the stadium on 5 June 2023.

Milestone matches

See also
 Development of stadiums in English football

References

External links

 

Sports venues in Middlesbrough
Middlesbrough F.C. facilities
Football venues in England
Premier League venues
Sports venues completed in 1995
English Football League venues
1995 establishments in England